Landry is a surname of French origin. Landry appears in the names of towns in France, Canada and the United States, as well as three canonized saints.

History
Landry: It was not until the early Middle Ages that surnames were introduced to distinguish between numbers of people bearing the same personal or Christian name. Landry is of patronymic origin, coming from Landericus, belonging to that category of names derived from the first name of the father or ancestor. In this case, the name simply denotes "the son of Landry", a popular personal name during the medieval period, early forms of which included Landri, and the regional variant Landry. Today in France, the name is also found in the forms of Landrin and Landron. The name is in fact, of ultimate Germanic origin, being derived from the old baptismal name "Land-rick", a composite name which signifies, literally, "land/country-powerful".

Different spellings of the same original surname are a common occurrence. Dictionaries of surnames indicate probable spelling variations of Landry to be:

 L'andre
 Landre
 Landri
 Landro
 Landrey
 Lendry

It appears, however, that it is not known for certain when the name was first recorded.

Although Landry is considered French in origin, it is not found throughout France. Rather it seems to have been concentrated around three small villages, south of the town of Loudon, province of Poitou: LaChausee, Martaize and Aulnay. In Quebec, however, the surname is quite commonly spread, along with Ladrie of probably similar origin.

I am given to understand that the Landry name is well known in the area around Loudun in Poitou, but is rather hard to find elsewhere in France.

Professor Stephen A. White, Genealogist at the Universite De Moncton in New Brunswick. N. Bujold and M. Caillebeau, Les origines francaises des premieres familles acadiennes:le sud Loundais (Poitiers:Imprimeirie L'Union, 1979) p. 32

List of persons with the surname
Adolphe Landry (1874–1956), French demographer and politician
Ali Landry (born 1973), American actress and model
Andrew Landry (born 1987), American golfer
Beau Landry (born 1991), Canadian football player
Bernard Landry (1937–2018), former Premier of Quebec
Carl Landry (born 1983), American basketball player
Cindy Landry (born 1972), Canadian pair skater
Dan Landry (born 1970), American volleyball player
Dawan Landry (born 1982), American football player
Geoffroy IV de la Tour Landry (c. 1320–1391), French nobleman who compiled Livre pour l'enseignement de ses filles
Ghislaine Landry (born 1988), Canadian rugby player
Greg Landry (born 1946), American football player
Hagan Landry (born 1994), American Paralympic athlete
Harold Landry (born 1996), American football player
Jarvis Landry (born 1992), American football player
Jeanne Landry (1922–2011), Canadian composer, pianist and teacher
Jeff Landry (born 1970), American politician
Joseph Aristide Landry (1817–1881), US Congressman
Joseph P. Landry (1922–2008), Canadian Senator
Kyle Landry (born 1986), Canadian basketball player
LaRon Landry (born 1984), American football player
Michelle Landry (born 1962), Australian politician
Nelly Landry (1916-2010), Belgian-born tennis player who later became a French citizen
Sir Pierre-Amand Landry, QC (1846–1916), Canadian lawyer, judge and political figure 
Pierre Henri Landry (1899–1990), French tennis player
Robert B. Landry (1909–2000), Major General US Air Force, adviser to President Truman
Ron Landry (1943-2020), American politician and lawyer
Sirkka-Liisa Landry (1926–2008), Finnish chess master
Tom Landry (1924–2000), American football player and coach

St. Landry
St. Landry, Bishop of Seez
St. Landry, Bishop of Paris
St. Landry, Bishop of Metz

See also
Landry (disambiguation)
St. Landry Parish, Louisiana

French-language surnames

de:Landry
fr:Landry